Rhagoletis batava (seabuckthorn fruit fly) is a species of tephritid or fruit flies in the genus Rhagoletis of the family Tephritidae. Rhagoletis batava larvae feed inside fruit flesh, and can be important pest of seabuckthorn. This species is very similar to Rhagoletis cerasi (European cherry fruit fly)

References

batava